A by-election was held in the constituency of the Southern Islands in Vanuatu in December 2009. 

The constituency covers four of the five islands of Tafea Province (Aniwa, Futuna, Erromango and Anatom, excluding only Tanna). It elects a single representative to Vanuatu. The by-election was due to the death of sitting MP Ture Kailo, of the Vanua'aku Party, who had died suddenly in October while attending a seminar organised by the Australian government in Canberra.

The seat was retained by the Vanua'aku Party; its candidate, Philip Charley, finished "well ahead" of the candidates from the Union of Moderate Parties and the National United Party.

References

2009 elections in Oceania
2009 in Vanuatu
By-elections to the Parliament of Vanuatu
December 2009 events in Oceania